Bill Dooley (born April 1, 1960) is the former head men's basketball coach at the University of Richmond from 1993 through 1997. Prior to taking the helm of the Spiders basketball program, he served as assistant coach at Richmond for eight years under Dick Tarrant.  Dooley began his collegiate playing career at Catholic University before transferring to the University of Richmond, where he served as team captain for the 1982–83 season. Dooley is currently an assistant coach at the University of Hartford after serving as varsity boys' basketball coach at Chestnut Hill Academy in Philadelphia.

After leaving Richmond, Dooley became head coach at Delaware Valley College in 1998.  After going 17–31, Dooley left to become head coach for Ireland's national team.  Following this run, Dooley returned to Delaware Valley in 2002 but left midseason the following year.

In 2004, Dooley was hired as an assistant at La Salle by Billy Hahn.  However, just three weeks after being hired the school was rocked by a rape scandal involving several players.  Dooley was named interim coach while Hahn was placed on administrative leave and ultimately dismissed.  Dooley was not retained as an assistant by new head coach John Giannini.

On August 10, 2012, Dooley was announced as an assistant for coach John Gallagher at Hartford.

On September 11, 2015, Dooley was announced as an assistant with the Virginia Tech Hokies women's basketball team under coach Dennis Wolff.

Head coaching record

References

1960 births
Living people
American expatriate basketball people in Ireland
American men's basketball players
American women's basketball coaches
Catholic University Cardinals men's basketball players
College men's basketball head coaches in the United States
Hartford Hawks men's basketball coaches
High school basketball coaches in the United States
Richmond Spiders men's basketball coaches
Richmond Spiders men's basketball players
Virginia Tech Hokies women's basketball coaches